Claudio Merlo (born 7 July 1946) is an Italian professional football coach and a former player, who played as a midfielder.

Club career
Merlo twice won the Coppa Italia in 1966 and 1975 with Fiorentina, and finished as a runner-up in the tournament in 1977 with Inter. He also helped Fiorentina to the Serie A title during the 1968–69 season, playing 26 of 30 matches.

International career
Merlo earned one cap for Italy, playing at the Azteca Stadium in Mexico City against Mexico on 5 January 1969.

Honours
Fiorentina
 Serie A champion: 1968–69.
 Coppa Italia winner: 1965–66.
 Mitropa Cup winner: 1966.

Inter
 Coppa Italia winner: 1977–78.

References

1946 births
Living people
Italian footballers
Italy international footballers
Serie A players
ACF Fiorentina players
Inter Milan players
U.S. Lecce players
Italian football managers
Association football midfielders